Beginish is one of the Blasket Islands of County Kerry, Ireland.

Geography 
It is a low-lying island (14 metres high) with an area of 13.8 hectares in Blasket Sound, between Great Blasket Island and the mainland. It has a large colony of Arctic terns.  The island is also the main birthing site for grey seals.

There is at least one other island in County Kerry called Beginish: it lies at the mouth of the River Ferta about 1 km from Valentia Island. The Island lies to the north of Valentia Harbour.

See also
 Beginish Island

References 

Blasket Islands
Uninhabited islands of Ireland

de:Blasket Islands